Meyer Sound Laboratories is an American company based in Berkeley, California that manufactures self-powered loudspeakers, multichannel audio show control systems, electroacoustic architecture, and audio analysis tools for the professional sound reinforcement, fixed installation, and sound recording industries.

The company's emphasis on research and measurement has resulted in the issuance of dozens of patents, including for the now-standard trapezoidal loudspeaker cabinet shape. Meyer Sound has pioneered other technologies that have become standard in the audio industry, including: processor-controlled loudspeaker systems, self-powered loudspeakers, curvilinear arraying, cardioid subwoofers, and source independent measurement.

Some symphony halls and performing arts facilities utilize Meyer Sound products, such as the rehearsal area at Davies Symphony Hall in San Francisco, Svetlanov Hall in Moscow, Russia, and the Musikverein in Vienna, Austria. Meyer Sound's Constellation acoustic system is used to manage outdoor sound at the New World Center in Miami, Florida, which is the headquarters for the New World Symphony.

History
In 1979, John and Helen Meyer established Meyer Sound to produce reliable high-fidelity products for sound reinforcement professionals. Meyer Sound's first product was the ACD/John Meyer studio monitor, based on a design Meyer developed while heading the acoustics laboratory at the Institute for Advanced Musical Studies in Switzerland. Prior to the founding of Meyer Sound, the Meyers started a relatively short-lived company named Glyph, which in part provided large speakers that were four to eight feet in diameter. However, bands were unable to bring the gigantic speakers with them when they traveled. Prior to this, John Meyer developed a sound system named "Glyph", which used said large loudspeakers. During this time period, Meyer was also involved in developing and constructing custom mixing consoles.

A demonstration of the ACD system led to Meyer Sound creating a subwoofer for film director Francis Ford Coppola’s use with the custom, quadraphonic sound system that toured with the original 70 mm release of Apocalypse Now. This was the first loudspeaker to use a dedicated processing unit to provide crossover, amplitude and phase correction, along with driver protection.

Also in 1979, the company developed the UM-1 UltraMonitor, which led to a long association with the band Grateful Dead. The UltraMonitor was the first product to employ a new, patented horn loudspeaker design that reduced distortion by a factor of ten compared to previous designs. This patent was the first of more than three dozen issued to the company since its founding. John Meyer was also involved in the development of the Grateful Dead's Wall of Sound.

In 1980, at the behest of Broadway sound designer Abe Jacob, Meyer Sound repackaged the technology of the UltraMonitor into the UPA-1. This loudspeaker had an immediate impact on theatrical sound, but was also notable for its introduction of the trapezoidal cabinet shape, which enabled the construction of curved arrays (flat-front arrays, in common use at the time, result in substantial destructive interference). A patent was issued for this innovation. The UPA-1 was an inaugural inductee into the TECnology Hall of Fame.

Meyer Sound pioneered high-level loudspeaker arrays with the release of the huge MSL-10 in 1981, followed by the MSL-3, a single cabinet (essentially a “slice” of an MSL-10) configurable into arrays of nearly any size.

Expanding on the appearance of real-time, dual FFT analyzers, Meyer Sound introduced source independent measurement (SIM) in 1984. SIM allowed sound system operators to use music itself as a test source for the first time, enabling continuous sound system correction over the course of a performance. SIM System II, the second generation of this technology (and the first version practical for widespread field use), won an R&D 100 Award (awarded for the 100 best engineering feats in any field worldwide) in 1992, in addition to the TEC award the original system received in 1986.

Meyer Sound introduced the HD-1 studio monitor, a fully integrated self-powered loudspeaker, in 1989. The HD-1 won at the TEC Awards in 1990 in the Transducer Technology category.

The release of the MSL-4 in 1994 marked the beginning of Meyer Sound's production of self-powered loudspeaker systems for high-level sound reinforcement, and, over the following years, the company converted their entire loudspeaker product line into self-powered systems.

Meyer Sound Laboratories has participated and been featured in several episodes of the Discovery Channel series “MythBusters” involving sound. As a result, Meyer Sound acoustician Roger Schwenke has become an "honorary" member of the MythBusters team. The first MythBusters episode involving the company was “busting” the myth that a duck's quack will not echo. The second time was the infamous “Brown Note” episode, which explored the myth that a person subjected to high levels of very low-frequency sound could experience “involuntary intestinal motility." In the course of busting this myth, John Meyer became interested in the physical aspect of transmission of very low frequencies. Three other MythBusters episodes involving sound tested the myths that a glass could be shattered by sound alone (confirmed), that a candle flame could be extinguished by sound alone (confirmed), and that an SKS rifle could be made to fire by subjecting it to massive quantities of very low frequencies from a subwoofer (busted).

In 2005, Meyer Sound acquired LCS Audio and launched its LCS Series of digital audio products.  The first new development by Meyer Sound of LCS technology was Constellation electroacoustic architecture, launched in 2006. Constellation is based on the VRAS (Variable Room Acoustic System) technology first developed and patented by Dr. Mark Poletti of Industrial Research Limited. An aspect of the Constellation system is that it uses an advanced, high-powered computer that calculates twenty thousand echoes per second. A Constellation system was installed in a rehearsal area at Davies Symphony Hall in San Francisco in late 2013, a facility that is used by the San Francisco Symphony and San Francisco Opera. D-Mitri, a next-generation engine for the LCS Series, was introduced in 2009.

In 2008, the USITT presented Meyer Sound founders John and Helen Meyer with the Harold Burris-Meyer Distinguished Career in Sound Design Award. Also in that year,  the John and Helen Meyer Scholarship was established in conjunction with the Escuela Superior Andaluza de Medios Audiovisuales (Superior School for AudioVisual Media) in Andalusia, Spain, and awarded to five students.

Meyer Sound also began making loudspeakers for cinema applications in 2009.

Milestones and awards

1979: Meyer Sound Laboratories founded."Horn Loudspeaker and Method for Producing Low Distortion Sound" patent granted.Introduced first dedicated loudspeaker processor.
1980: "Trapezoidal Loudspeaker Cabinet" patent granted.The Meyer Sound UPA-1 introduced as the first commercial trapezoidal loudspeaker.
1984: Source Independent Measurement (SIM) system introduced."Circuit and Method for Correcting Distortion in Digital Audio Systems" patent granted.
1985: Audio Engineering Society (AES) awards Fellowship to John Meyer
1986: Technical Excellence and Creativity (TEC) award for Outstanding Technical Achievement, Acoustics Technology given to SIM (Source Independent Measurement)
1989: HD-1 High Definition Audio Monitor introduced.
1990: TEC award for Outstanding Technical Achievement, Transducer Technology given to HD-1 studio monitor
1992: R&D 100 Award given to SIM System II
1993: "Correction Circuit and Method for Improving the Transient Behavior of a Two-Way Loudspeaker System" patents granted.
1995: "MSL-4 Self-Powered Loudspeaker System" patent granted.Lighting Dimension International Sound Product of the Year award given to the Self-Powered Series of loudspeakers
1996: "Improved Loudspeaker Horn" patent granted.First used in CQ-1 and CQ-2 loudspeakers"MTS-4A Full-Range Main Loudspeaker" patent granted.Theatre Crafts International Sound Product of the Year award given to UPA-1P and UPA-2P
1997: "SB-1 Parabolic Long-Throw Sound Beam" patent granted.
1998: PSW-6 High-Power Cardioid Subwoofer introduced
1999: AES awards Citation to Helen MeyerTEC award for Outstanding Technical Achievement, Sound Reinforcement Loudspeaker Technology given to PSW-6 subwoofer
2000:UPM-1P Ultracompact Wide Coverage Loudspeaker introducedX-10 High Resolution Linear Control Room Monitor introducedTEC award for Outstanding Technical Achievement, Sound Reinforcement Loudspeaker Technology given to UPM-1P
2001:M3D Line Array Loudspeaker with Broadband QEDDY Sound Product of the Year award given to UPM-2P
2002:M2D and M1D Curvilinear Array Loudspeakers
2003:MILO High-Power Curvilinear Array LoudspeakerProducción Profesional & Producción Audio Award (Spain) for Best Sound Reinforcement Product given to M3DEDDY Sound Product of the Year given to M1D and M2DMeyer Sound First Appears on MythBusters
2004:"Manifold for a Horn Loudspeaker (REM)" patent granted."Interconnectable Rigging System for Loudspeakers and Rigging Frames" patent granted.Mipa award for best Large Format PA System given to MILOEDDY Sound Product of the Year given to UPJ-1PTEC award for Outstanding Technical Achievement, Sound Reinforcement Loudspeaker Technology given to MILOParnelli Award for Lifetime Achievement given to John Meyer
2005:"U.S. Patent Issued for Meyer Sound MAPP Online Method" patent granted
2006:Mipa award for best Large Format PA System given to MICA
2007:Mipa award for best Large Format PA System given to M’elodieAES presents Silver Medal to John Meyer
2008:TEC award for Outstanding Technical Achievement, Sound Reinforcement Loudspeaker Technology given to UPJuniorUSITT recognizes Pearson Theatre with an Architecture Merit awardEast Bay Business Times declares Helen Meyer a Woman of Distinction
2009:Mipa award for best PA System given to UPQ-1PUSITT presents John and Helen Meyer with Harold Burris-Meyer Distinguished Career in Sound Design AwardUPQ series wins Loudspeaker Product of the Year from Live DesignAmerican Institute of Architects gives a citation award to the Pearson TheatreSB-3F sound field synthesis loudspeaker is awarded System Contractor News' award for Most Innovative Loudspeaker for Commercial Installation
TEC award for Outstanding Technical Achievement, Sound Reinforcement Loudspeaker Technology given to UPQ
JM-1P and UP-4XP Win WFX New Product Awards

References

Bibliography

External links
Interview with John Meyer for the NAMM (National Association of Music Merchants) Oral History Program April 2, 2012

Audio amplifier manufacturers
Manufacturers of professional audio equipment
Loudspeaker manufacturers
Manufacturing companies based in California
Companies based in Berkeley, California
Electronics companies established in 1979
1979 establishments in California
Technology companies based in the San Francisco Bay Area
Audio equipment manufacturers of the United States